J. Ragnar Kamp (born April 9, 1953) is a Swedish-American curler and World Champion. He won a gold medal at the 1977 World Curling Championships for Sweden. After winning the Worlds, Kamp threatened to move to Canada, complaining of Sweden's 'high taxes' and 'negative outlook'.  After the 1980 World Championships, Kamp made due on his promise and moved to Port Hawkesbury, Nova Scotia, and won two provincial championships, in 1984 and in 1989. He then moved to Ellsworth, Maine where he played in five U.S. national championships (2000, 2001, 2002, 2003, 2004).

In 1978 he was inducted into the Swedish Curling Hall of Fame.

References

External links
 

Living people
1953 births
Swedish male curlers
World curling champions
Swedish curling champions
Curlers from Nova Scotia
American male curlers
People from Inverness County, Nova Scotia
People from Ellsworth, Maine
European curling champions
Swedish emigrants to Canada
Swedish emigrants to the United States